Gimlet Creek is a stream in Bollinger County in the U.S. state of Missouri.

Gimlet Creek most likely was so named for its resemblance to a gimlet.

See also
List of rivers of Missouri

References

Rivers of Bollinger County, Missouri
Rivers of Missouri